A piyyut or piyut (plural piyyutim or piyutim,   ; from Greek ποιητής poiētḗs "poet") is a Jewish liturgical poem, usually designated to be sung, chanted, or recited during religious services. Piyyutim have been written since Temple times. Most piyyutim are in Hebrew or Aramaic, and most follow some poetic scheme, such as an acrostic following the order of the Hebrew alphabet or spelling out the name of the author.

Many piyyutim are familiar to regular attendees of synagogue services. For example, the best-known piyyut may be Adon Olam ("Master of the World"). Its poetic form consists of a repeated rhythmic pattern of short-long-long-long (the so-called hazaj meter), and it is so beloved that it is often sung at the conclusion of many synagogue services, after the ritual nightly recitation of the Shema, and during the morning ritual of putting on tefillin phylacteries. Another beloved piyyut is Yigdal ("May God be Hallowed"), which is based upon the Thirteen Principles of Faith set forth by Maimonides.

Important scholars of piyyut today include Shulamit Elizur and Joseph Yahalom, both at Hebrew University.

The author of a piyyut is known as a paytan or payyetan (פייטן); plural paytanim (פייטנים).

History

The Eretz Yisrael school
The earliest piyyutim date from the Talmudic and Geonic periods. They were "overwhelmingly [from][Eretz Yisrael] or its neighbor Syria, [because] only there was the Hebrew language sufficiently cultivated that it could be managed with stylistic correctness, and only there could it be made to speak so expressively." The earliest Eretz Yisrael prayer manuscripts, found in the Cairo Genizah, often consist of piyyutim, as these were the parts of the liturgy that required to be written down: the wording of the basic prayers was generally known by heart, and there was supposed to be a prohibition of writing them down.  It is not always clear from the manuscripts whether these piyyutim, which often elaborated the themes of the basic prayers, were intended to supplement them or to replace them, or indeed whether they originated in a time before the basic prayers had become fixed.  The piyyutim, in particular those of Eleazar Kalir, were often in very cryptic and allusive language, with copious reference to Midrash.

Originally, the word piyyut designated every type of sacred poetry, but as usage developed, the term came to designate only poems of hymn character. The piyyutim were usually composed by a talented rabbinic poet, and depending on the piyyut’s reception by the community determined whether it would pass the test of time. By looking at the composers of the piyyutim, one is able to see which family names were part of the Middle Eastern community, and which hachamim were prominent and well established. The composers of various piyyutim usually used acrostic form in order to hint their identity in the piyyut itself. Since prayer books were limited at the time, many piyyutim have repeating stanzas that the congregation would respond to followed by the hazzan’s recitations.

The additions of the piyyutim to the services were mostly used as an embellishment to the services and to make it more enjoyable to the congregation. As to the origin of the piyyut's implementation, there is a theory that this had to do with restrictions on Jewish prayer. Samau'al Ibn Yahya al-Maghribi, a Jewish convert to Islam in the twelfth century, wrote that the Persians prohibited Jews from holding prayer services. "When the Jews saw that the Persians persisted in obstructing their prayer, they invented invocations into which they admixed passages from their prayers (the piyyut) … and set numerous tunes to them". They would assemble at prayer time in order to read and chant the piyyutim. The difference between that and prayer is that the prayer is without melody and is read only by the person conducting the service, whereas in the recitation of the piyyut, the cantor is assisted by the congregation in chanting melodies. "When the Persians rebuked them for this, the Jews sometimes asserted that they were singing, and sometimes [mourning over their situations]." When the Muslims took over and allowed Jews dhimmi status, prayer became permissible for the Jews, and the piyyut had become a commendable tradition for holidays and other joyous occasions.

The use of piyyut was always considered an Eretz Yisrael speciality: the Babylonian Geonim made every effort to discourage it and restore what they regarded as the statutory wording of the prayers, holding that "any [hazzan] who uses piyyut thereby gives evidence that he is no scholar".  It is not always clear whether their main objection was to any use of piyyutim at all or only to their intruding into the heart of the statutory prayers.

For these reasons, scholars classifying the liturgies of later periods usually hold that, the more a given liturgy makes use of piyyutim, the more likely it is to reflect Eretz Yisrael as opposed to Babylonian influence. The framers of the Sephardic liturgy took the Geonic strictures seriously, and for this reason the early Eretz Yisrael piyyutim, such as those of Kalir, do not survive in the Sephardic rite, though they do in the Ashkenazic and Italian rites.

The medieval Spanish school

In the later Middle Ages, however, Spanish-Jewish poets such as Judah Halevi, Ibn Gabirol, Abraham ibn Ezra and Moses ibn Ezra composed quantities of religious poetry, in correct Biblical Hebrew and strict Arabic metres. Many of these poems have been incorporated into the Sephardic, and to a lesser extent the other, rites, and may be regarded as a second generation of piyyut.

The Kabbalistic school of Isaac Luria and his followers, which used an adapted Sephardic liturgy, disapproved of the Spanish piyyutim, regarding them as spiritually inauthentic, and invoked the Geonic strictures to have them either eliminated from the service or moved away from the core parts of it.  Their disapproval did not extend to piyyutim of the early Eretz Yisrael school, which they regarded as an authentic part of the Talmudic-rabbinic tradition. Although Luria himself would go to Ashkenazic communities at times when they would recite piyyutim in order to recite those from the Eretz Yisrael school, no Sephardic community reinstituted these piyyutim, presumably because these had already been eliminated from the service and they regarded it as too late to put them back. (The Kabbalists, and their successors, also wrote piyyutim of their own.) For this reason, some piyyutim of the Spanish school survive in their original position in the Spanish and Portuguese rite but have been eliminated or moved in the Syrian  and other Oriental rites. Syrian Jews preserve some of them for extra-liturgical use as pizmonim.

Well-known piyyutim
What follows is a chart of some of the best-known and most-beloved piyyutim. This is by no means an exhaustive list, but it tries to provide a flavor of the variety of poetic schemes and occasions for which these poems were written. Many of the piyyutim marked as being recited on Shabbat are songs traditionally sung as part of the home ritual observance of Shabbat and also known as zemirot ("Songs/Melodies").

See also
David Hakohen
Genres of Piyyut
Jewish services

References

External links
 Piyut site - audio recordings of piyyutim, along with corresponding lyrics in Hebrew
 Jewish Encyclopedia article on piyyutim
    Center of Jewish Music and Poetry

 
Hebrew poetry
Aramaic-language songs